The Strongest Man in History is a History Channel original series, which premiered on July 7, 2019. It is a reality-show that takes four strongmen, Eddie Hall, Brian Shaw, Robert Oberst, and Nick Best around the world investigating strongmen legends and trying to beat the legend and each other in a quest to prove who really is the Strongest Man in History. The first season consisted of seven episodes.

Strongmen 
 Nick Best – World's Strongest Man finalist, power-lifting champion of the world in the late 1990s and held the former world record in the Shield Carry. 
 Eddie Hall – 2017 World's Strongest Man winner and held the former world record for the deadlift, lifting 500 kg (1,102 lb). 
 Robert Oberst – World's Strongest Man finalist and held the former American record for the log lift at 465 lb. 
 Brian Shaw – 2011, 2013, 2015 and 2016 World's Strongest Man champion.

Episodes

Season 1 (2019)

References

External links 

History (American TV channel) original programming
2019 American television series debuts
2019 American television series endings
2010s American reality television series
English-language television shows